Rhythm of Youth is the debut studio album by Canadian new wave and synth-pop band Men Without Hats, released in April 1982 by Statik Records in Europe and Canada and in 1983 by Backstreet Records in the US. It propelled them to fame with its second single, "The Safety Dance". It was released under the Statik Records label in Canada, distributed by Warner Music Canada (then called WEA Canada) where it achieved Platinum status for sales of 100,000 units.

Release history 
The US releases of this album featured a different track listing, replacing "Living in China" with an edited version of "Antarctica" (the full version of which appeared on Folk of the 80's) and including an extended 
version of "The Safety Dance".

In 1984, the album was released on CD in Europe by Statik Records, featuring the Folk of the 80's EP (albeit including the single edit of "Antarctica") and the extended mix of "The Safety Dance" as bonus tracks. It was re-released on CD in Canada in 1997 by Oglio Records as part of a "two-fer" including Folk of the 80's (Part III) and the single edit of "Antarctica".

In 2010, the album was remastered and reissued in Canada by the band's label, Bulldog Brothers, featuring the original US track list (with "Antarctica" replaced with "Living in China") and including all the tracks from both the US and UK LP releases, plus a demo version of "Ban the Game" (known as "Ban the Game II"), an extended mix of "I Got the Message" and a club mix of "The Safety Dance".

Critical reception
Cash Box called the single "I Like" "a forceful performance, grounded...on songwriter Ivan Doroschuk’s sardonic vocal" and particularly praised the production.

Track listing

1982 Canada/UK LP/CD

1983 US LP

1983 US cassette

2010 Canadian CD remaster

Personnel
Musicians
Ivan Doroschuk – vocals, guitars, piano, percussion, electronics
Allan McCarthy – keyboards, piano, electronics, percussion
Stefan Doroschuk – guitars, violin
Martin Cartier – percussion
Colin Doroschuk – additional guitars
Anne Dussault – female vocals
Michel Jermone – castanets
Daniel A. Vermette – acoustic guitars

Production
Marc Durand – producer
Dixon Van Winkle – recording and engineering

Charts

Certifications

References

External links

Men Without Hats albums
1982 debut albums
Backstreet Records albums
Sire Records albums
Virgin Records albums